Melck's house bat (Neoromicia melckorum) is a species of vesper bat. It is found in Democratic Republic of the Congo, Kenya, Malawi, Mozambique, South Africa, Tanzania, Zambia, Zimbabwe and Madagascar. Its natural habitat is savanna.

References

Neoromicia
Taxonomy articles created by Polbot
Mammals described in 1919
Bats of Africa
Taxa named by Austin Roberts